ANR Pipeline delivers gas from Texas, the Oklahoma panhandle region, and Louisiana to the Midwest and Great Lakes region.  It has two legs, one from Texas and the other from Louisiana, which meet near Chicago.

History
ANR was founded as the Michigan-Wisconsin Pipe Line Company on July 25, 1945. In 1947, the company received federal approval to build a $52 million, 1,800-mile-long pipeline from Texas to the Detroit-Ann Arbor area and to sections of Wisconsin, Missouri and Iowa. The Michigan-Wisconsin Pipeline began operations on November 1, 1949. The pipeline ran from Hansford County in the Texas Panhandle through Oklahoma, Kansas, Nebraska, Missouri and Iowa to Illinois, where it branches in two with one line to serve Michigan and the other Wisconsin.

The Michigan-Wisconsin Pipe Line Company's name was changed in 1984 to the ANR Pipeline Company, in order to identify the company more closely with its parent, American Natural Resources. In 1985, American Natural Resources was acquired by Coastal Corporation. El Paso Energy acquired Coastal Corporation in 2001. El Paso Energy sold ANR Pipeline to TransCanada Corporation in 2007.

Incidents
Explosion of 1993

On November 23rd, 1993 there was an explosion on the pipeline in New Castle, Indiana.

Explosion of 2008
Six crew members of the vessel were injured and one left missing.

Rupture of 2014
On September 16, 2014, around 2am EDT, a rupture occurred on the pipeline in Benton Township, Berrien County, Michigan. About 520 people were evacuated.

See also
Horizon Pipeline
Panhandle Eastern

References

External links
ANR Company Information
ANR Pipeline Co. History

Natural gas pipelines in the United States
TC Energy
Natural gas pipelines in Texas
Natural gas pipelines in Michigan
Natural gas pipelines in Wisconsin
Natural gas pipelines in Missouri
Natural gas pipelines in Iowa
Natural gas pipelines in Oklahoma
Natural gas pipelines in Kansas
Natural gas pipelines in Nebraska
Natural gas pipelines in Illinois
Natural gas pipelines in Louisiana